Bimini Bon-Boulash (also known mononymously as Bimini; born 12 May 1993) is the stage name of Thomas Hibbitts, an English drag queen, author, recording artist and model based in East London, and born in Great Yarmouth, England. They are best known for competing on the second series of RuPaul's Drag Race UK, where they placed as a runner-up.

Early life and career
Hibbitts' parents separated when Hibbitts was a child. Hibbits describes themself as being raised in a working-class environment. Hibbitts attended Lynn Grove Academy, moving to London in 2012 to study journalism at the London College of Communication. In London Hibbitts discovered drag, beginning their career as a drag performer in 2017.

Bimini has professionally fulfilled their career as a drag queen since 2019, and was heavily inspired to kick-start their career by the spirit of their fashion heroes Alexander McQueen, Vivienne Westwood, Iris van Herpen, and John Galliano. Bimini has stated that their greatest inspiration as to their look and aesthetic is Pamela Anderson. Their drag name derives from what they would be called if they were assigned female at birth, and the name of their first cat, Bonnie Boulash. Bimini is based in East London, and regularly performs across the capital.

In December 2020, Bimini was announced as one of twelve contestants competing on the second series of RuPaul's Drag Race UK. In Episode 1, Bimini lip-synced against Joe Black to "Relax" by Frankie Goes to Hollywood, which they won, sending Joe home. They later won four challenges, including the Snatch Game, where they portrayed Katie Price, becoming the first contestant in the British version to win four challenges. In Episode 9, Bimini became the first contestant to reach the finale after lip-syncing in the first episode. After a final lip-sync in Episode 10, they were announced as a runner-up, along with fellow competitor Tayce, to eventual winner Lawrence Chaney.

In February 2021, Bon Boulash made their London Fashion Week runway debut alongside fellow Drag Race contestant A'Whora with Art School London, a genderless fashion label for designer Eden Loweth's AW21 collection. In March 2021, Bimini, alongside their fellow Drag Race finalists, was photographed and interviewed for The Guardian. In July 2021, Bimini embarked on a sold-out UK tour alongside A'Whora, Tayce and Lawrence Chaney for the United Kingdolls Tour with promoter Klub Kids, and in February 2022 Bimini will embark on RuPaul's Drag Race UK: The Official Tour alongside the entire cast of the second series of RuPaul's Drag Race UK, in association with World of Wonder and promoter Voss Events.

It was announced via Bimini's Instagram account in March 2021 they would be writing a book with the working title A Drag Queen's Guide to Life, scheduled for release in October 2021, and published by Penguin Books and Viking Books. The book was released with the title Release the Beast: A Drag Queen's Guide to Life. "Release the Beast" is a reference to Bimini's verse on "UK Hun?", which she performed with The United Kingdolls in RuPaul's Drag Race UK.

In June 2021, Bimini released their first single "God Save This Queen", as well as a corresponding music video.

On 21 August 2021, they presented the Saturday-afternoon slot on BBC Radio 1 from 1pm alongside Dean McCullough, as part of the radio station's "drag day". Boulash made a cameo in the 2021 Christmas advertisement for supermarket Sainsbury's.

In November 2021, Bimini was awarded the GAY TIMES magazine's Honour for Drag Hero at a celebration in London, as well as featuring as the cover star for the GAY TIMES Honours edition.

Personal life
Bimini currently resides in East London, England. Bimini is non-binary and uses they/them pronouns when out of drag and she/her pronouns when in drag. They spoke about coming to terms with their gender identity in a conversation on the third episode Drag Race with fellow non-binary contestant Ginny Lemon. Their open conversation was praised by viewers and sparked confidence in many to discuss their gender identity with those closest to them. Bimini has consumed an exclusively vegan diet for eight years.

Filmography

Television

Film

Music videos

Radio

Web series

Discography

Bibliography
 Autobiography

 Release the Beast: A Drag Queen's Guide to Life (Penguin, 2021)

Stage

Awards and nominations

References

External links

Living people
1993 births
20th-century English LGBT people
21st-century English LGBT people
English drag queens
Non-binary drag performers
People from London
RuPaul's Drag Race UK contestants